Paul Sheriff (13 November 1903 – 25 September 1960) was a Russian-born British art director.  In early life he used the names Paul Schouvaloff, or Paul Shouvalov. He won an Academy Award and was nominated for another in the category Best Art Direction.

Selected filmography
 The Divorce of Lady X (1938)
 French Without Tears (1940)
 Freedom Radio (1941)
 Henry V (1944)
 Moulin Rouge (1952)
 Three Cases of Murder (1955)
 Interpol (1957)

Awards and nominations
Sheriff won an Academy Award for Best Art Direction and was nominated for another:

Won
 Moulin Rouge (1952)

Nominated
 Henry V (1944)

References

External links
 
 

1903 births
1960 deaths
British art directors
Best Art Direction Academy Award winners
Emigrants from the Russian Empire to the United Kingdom